Lasiomma seminitidum is a species of fly in the family Anthomyiidae. It is found in the  Palearctic . For identification see

References

External links
Images representing Lasiomma seminitidum at BOLD

Anthomyiidae
Insects described in 1845
Muscomorph flies of Europe